AIDS Education and Prevention is a bimonthly peer-reviewed public health journal published by Guilford Press on behalf of the International Society for AIDS Education. 

It covers  education and prevention of AIDS, including epidemiological studies of risk behaviors. According to the Journal Citation Reports, the journal has a 2021 impact factor of  1.920. 

The editor-in-chief is Francisco S. Sy (National Institute on Minority Health and Health Disparities).

References

External links 
 

HIV/AIDS journals
Public health journals
Bimonthly journals
English-language journals
Guilford Press academic journals